Ellen Jones is a British scholar and translator. She studied at Oxford University and Queen Mary University, completing a PhD from the latter. Her research focuses on literary multilingualism and translation. She has taught at Goldsmiths University of London, Queen Mary University of London, and the National Autonomous University of Mexico (UNAM). She has translated contemporary Chilean authors including Juan Pablo Roncone, Enrique Winter, and Nona Fernández. Her translation of Rodrigo Fuentes' short story collection Trout, Belly Up was published by Charco Press in 2019. Her 2022 book Literature in Motion: Translating Multiculturalism Across the Americas deals with translating multilingual literature, in particular, that of U.S. Latinx authors Susana Chávez-Silverman, Junot Díaz, and Giannina Braschi; and Brazilian writer Wilson Bueno.

Jones was Criticism Editor at Asymptote journal from 2014 to 2019. She is currently based in Mexico City.

Works

Translation (books) 

 Nancy, by Bruno Lloret, 2020
 Let's Talk About Your Wall: Mexican Writers Respond to the Immigration Crisis, edited by Carmen Boullosa and Alberto Quintero, 2020 (Translations also by Lisa Dillman, Sophie Hughes, Victor Meadowcroft, Jessica Méndez Sayer, and Samantha Schnee)
 Trout, Belly Up, by Rodrigo Fuentes, 2019
 Suns, by Enrique Winter, 2017 (Translated by Ellen Jones, David McLoghlin and Mary Ellen Stitt)

Scholarly 

 Literature in Motion: Translating Multiculturalism Across the Americas, 2022

References

Spanish–English translators
Alumni of the University of Oxford
Alumni of Queen Mary University of London
Academics of Goldsmiths, University of London
Academics of Queen Mary University of London
20th-century British translators
21st-century British translators
Year of birth missing (living people)
Living people
Place of birth missing (living people)